Philiphaugh is a village by the Yarrow Water, on the outskirts of Selkirk, in the Scottish Borders.

Places nearby include Bowhill, Broadmeadows, the Ettrick Water, Ettrickbridge, Lindean, Salenside, Yarrowford and the Yair Forest.

Originally referred to as the land owned as part of Philiphaugh Estate, the name is today more commonly used to describe the most southern parts of Selkirk. Philiphaugh rugby ground is the home of Selkirk Rugby Club. Selkirk Cricket Club is the site of the Battle of Philiphaugh, fought on 13 September 1645 at the height of the Wars of the Three Kingdoms.

The grave of Tibbie Tamson (died 1790), a suicide from Selkirk buried in unconsecrated ground, is located at an isolated spot near Harehead Hill at the boundary between the Philiphaugh and Bowhill estates. The grave is maintained by way of an apology.

See also
List of places in the Scottish Borders
List of places in Scotland
Scottish Border Towns

References

External links

CANMORE/RCAHMS record of Selkirk, Philiphaugh Mill
RCAHMS record of Selkirk, Philiphaugh Sawmill
Scottish Borders Council: Philiphaugh Community School
Geograph image: The cauld by the Philiphaugh Salmon Viewing Centre
VisitScotland: Philiphaugh Salmon Viewing Centre

Villages in the Scottish Borders
Eildon
Areas in Scotland